Mary Geneva "Mamie" Eisenhower (November 14, 1896 – November 1, 1979) was the first lady of the United States from 1953 to 1961 as the wife of President Dwight D. Eisenhower. Born in Boone, Iowa, she was raised in a wealthy household in Colorado. She married Dwight D. Eisenhower, then a lieutenant in the United States Army, in 1916. She kept house and served as hostess for military officers as they moved between various postings in the United States, Panama, the Philippines, and France. Their relationship was complicated by his regular absences on duty and by the death of their firstborn son at the age of three. She became a prominent figure during World War II as the wife of General Eisenhower.

As first lady, Eisenhower was given near total control over the expenses and scheduling of the White House. She closely managed the staff, and her frugality was apparent in White House budgeting throughout her tenure. She entertained many foreign heads of state in her role as hostess. She showed little interest in politics and was rarely involved in political discussion, though she did support soldiers' welfare and civil rights causes. She suffered from poor balance due to Ménière's disease, giving rise to rumors of alcoholism. She was popular during her tenure as first lady, and she was recognized as a fashion icon, known for her iconic bangs and frequent use of the color pink.  Mamie and Dwight Eisenhower were married for 52 years until his death in March 1969. She spent her retirement and widowhood at the family farm in Gettysburg, Pennsylvania. She suffered a stroke on September 25, 1979, and resided in the hospital until her death on November 1.

Early life

Mary Geneva "Mamie" Doud was born in Boone, Iowa, as the second child to meatpacking executive John Sheldon Doud (1870–1951) and his wife Elivera Mathilda Carlson (1878–1960). She grew up in Cedar Rapids, Iowa; Colorado Springs, Colorado; Denver, Colorado; and the Doud winter home in San Antonio, Texas. Her mother was a daughter of Swedish immigrants, and Swedish was often spoken at home. Her father ran a meatpacking company founded by his father, Doud & Montgomery, until he retired at age 36. He also had investments in Illinois and Iowa stockyards, producing a sizeable fortune. His wealth provided the family with many comforts, including servants that tended to their needs and connections with high society.

Mamie had three sisters: her older sister Eleanor Carlson Doud, and her two younger sisters Eda Mae Doud and Mabel Frances "Mike" Doud. The family was beset by tragedy early in Mamie's life upon the death of her sister Eleanor at the age of 17. Their parents operated under strict separation of spheres in which the father made decisions for the family and the business while the mother ran the household. Having a staff to tend to the household's needs, she never learned to keep house, skills that she would eventually have to learn from her husband. She came down with a severe case of rheumatic fever as a child, bringing about a lifelong concern for health. Though her education was limited, her father taught her how to manage budgeting and finance. Her family traveled extensively, and when she grew older, she was sent to Wolcott School for Girls for finishing school.

Marriage and family

Marriage 

Doud had many suitors, but she began courting Dwight D. "Ike" Eisenhower in 1915, who at the time was a second lieutenant. They were introduced while the Douds were visiting a friend at Fort Sam Houston. He broke convention by inviting her to tour the facility with him while he made his rounds. She was immediately infatuated with him, but she initially turned him down when he asked her on a date. He pursued her for the following month as she courted other suitors before they began to date exclusively, and they were engaged on the following Valentine's Day in 1916. Ike had initially given her a miniature of his West Point class ring as was custom. On her request, he later gave her a full size ring, and he formally asked permission to marry her on Saint Patrick's Day. Mamie would go on to celebrate both Valentine's Day and Saint Patrick's Day as the anniversary of their engagement.

Mamie's father agreed to the marriage on the condition that Eisenhower did not enter the Army Air Service, as he considered it too dangerous. Apprehension of American entry into World War I accelerated their plans to wed, and they were married at the Doud family's home in Denver on July 1, 1916. They went on honeymoon and visited Ike's parents in Abilene, Kansas before returning to Fort Sam Houston where Ike was stationed. She also met Ike's brother, Milton S. Eisenhower, who would become a close friend to Mamie in his own right.

Army wife 
Eisenhower lived the life of an army wife over the following years, continually moving as her husband was stationed at different posts. Over the course of Ike's 37 years in the military, they would live in 33 different homes. During some of these postings, she would participate in community projects, such as the establishment of a hospital in Panama. Their military housing was often meager, and she was tasked with furnishing their temporary homes and making them livable. The Eisenhowers regularly entertained wherever they lived, and their home came to be known as "Club Eisenhower". Mamie would often attend card parties and luncheons with officers' wives She befriended many of them, but she had little patience for the gossip and intrigue that sometimes took place, refusing to take part in it.

Eisenhower no longer had the comforts that she had grown accustomed to in childhood. They had to survive on Ike's military pay and occasional support from Mamie's father. Ike and Mamie were often both physically and emotionally distant from one another, and Mamie experienced bouts of depression throughout her time as an army wife. She had to grow accustomed to fear and loneliness during periods of separation while her husband was traveling for the army, and Ike once told her that his duty would "always come first".

The Eisenhowers had two sons. Their first son, Doud Dwight "Icky" Eisenhower, was born on September 24, 1917. Having to care the baby on her own despite her weak health, she worked herself to exhaustion. Icky died of scarlet fever at the age of three on January 2, 1921. Mamie was devastated, and she had little to distract herself from the tragedy. Their second son, John Sheldon Doud Eisenhower, was born in Denver, Colorado on August 3, 1922. Her second son's birth helped alleviate some of the depression brought about by her previous son's death and her separations from Ike, and she would dote on John well into adulthood. John would go on to serve in the military, serve as the United States Ambassador to Belgium, and author several books.

Ike had been stationed in Panama in 1922, and Mamie had struggled in the jungle environment. They went to Denver shortly before John's birth, and Mamie stayed behind after Ike returned to Panama. She rejoined him in Panama two months later, accompanied by a nurse the family had hired to help raise the baby. On the advice of the wife of General Fox Conner, Mamie took interest in Ike's career and presented herself as a supportive military wife, strengthening their relationship. In 1928, she encouraged her husband to take a position in Paris instead of a position in the War Department. Eisenhower hosted increasingly important guests as her husband's military career progressed. When Ike was appointed as aide to General Douglas MacArthur in 1929, the family moved to Washington, D.C., and "Club Eisenhower" became a popular social hub for the city's elite. She initially chose to stay in Washington when her husband was stationed in the Philippines in 1935, and their relationship was strained by the time she joined him the following year. The family returned to the United States shortly after the onset of World War II in 1939.

General's wife 

During World War II, while promotion and fame came to Ike, his wife lived in Washington, D.C. During the three years in which Ike was stationed in Europe, Mamie saw him only once. She made her own contributions to the war effort, volunteering anonymously for the American Women's Voluntary Services and the United Service Organizations, among other groups. Eisenhower was in constant worry of her husband's safety while he led the war effort in Europe, and she was regularly accosted by reporters, causing her to lose 20 pounds during the war. Rumors emerged that she suffered from alcoholism, though no evidence supported these claims. Her struggle was further complicated by Ike's close relationship with his chauffeur Kay Summersby; she had become a close confidant of Ike's, and rumors emerged that he had taken her as a mistress. Ike's military success and his subsequent memoirs provided the couple with financial stability after the war.

After Ike became president of Columbia University in 1948, the Eisenhowers purchased a farm (now the Eisenhower National Historic Site) at Gettysburg, Pennsylvania. It was the first home they had ever owned. She continued in her hosting duties, this time for faculty wives and large donors in addition to the friends her husband had made in the military. Ike was then made commander of the North Atlantic Treaty Organization forces, and their return to Paris delayed work on their dream home, which would not be completed until 1955. While in Europe, the two regularly received royals, and Mamie was awarded the Cross of Merit for her role in her husband's military success. When Ike agreed to run in the 1952 presidential election, Mamie helped campaigned for him. She appeared to enjoy campaigning, and she was popular among voters. She would sometimes subvert the wishes of her husband's campaign managers, making speaking appearances without their knowledge and suggesting changes to his campaign speeches.

First Lady of the United States

White House hostess 

Eisenhower became first lady as the position first began to present a national public image. She maligned the attention associated with the role, insisting that her husband was the public figure of the family and generally refusing to take on duties outside of the White House. She maintained distance from the press, avoiding interviews and having her secretary Mary Jane McCaffree address reporters in her stead. She also declined a request to write a column for the New York Herald Tribune, and she held only one press conference during her tenure. She was friendly with reporters when they did interact, insisting that they address her as Mamie. Her ambivalence toward the press did not extend toward photographers, and she readily accommodated them. She also wrote a personal response to every letter that she received and sometimes passed on concerns that the letters raised.

Despite her reservations about public life, Eisenhower did enjoy her role as a hostess. During her time as first lady, she would entertain for the heads of state of many countries. In total, she would entertain about 70 official foreign visitors. She was a capable hostess, having spent much of her adult life hosting as a military wife. She hosted social events full time and reveled in the pageantry associated with the presidency. Eisenhower was lauded for her social prowess, greeting and shaking hands with thousands of people during her tenure as first lady. When entertaining, she prioritized comfort and popular taste over prestige. She often employed male quartets and musicians such as Fred Waring to perform for guests at the White House.

Media coverage of Eisenhower was generally favorable, and it focused primarily on her personality and charm rather than politics or scandal.

Managing the White House 
Eisenhower took naturally to managing the White House and its staff, drawing on her experience as an army wife. She had a strained relationship with the staff after taking charge, having imposed many rules to liken them to more traditional house staff and managing them closely. Over time she built relationships with the staff, treating them as family and even celebrating their birthdays. When their house in Gettysburg was completed in 1955, they celebrated by throwing a housewarming party for the White House staff. Eisenhower typically managed the White House from her bedroom, staying in bed due to her poor health. The Eisenhowers had been accustomed to splitting their responsibilities, and Mamie was given total authority over house spending and scheduling. She had developed a strict frugality as an army wife, and she micromanaged White House expenses. She was known for her frugality, and she would even clip coupons for the White House staff. Her recipe for "Mamie's million dollar fudge" was reproduced by housewives all over the country after it was printed in many publications.

During her tenure, she had several rooms redecorated in her favorite colors of pink and green. Eisenhower was especially active during the Christmas season, during which time she had the White House heavily decorated for the occasion and bought gifts for the White House staff. In 1958, she was also reported to be the first person to initiate Halloween decorations to be put up in the White House. Her attempts to decorate the White House were complicated by a lack of federal funding, and much of her changes depended on private donations. She dedicated much time to the flower arrangements of the White House, favoring gladiolus plants. Her possessiveness over White House decor sometimes caused conflict with the staff, as it contradicted the recognized norm that the first family were residents rather than owners of the White House. She held great reverence for the building itself, saying that she "never drove up to the south portico without a lump coming to [her] throat".

When Ike suffered from a heart attack in 1955, Mamie helped keep him warm and get him medical attention. Afterward, she regularly tended to him, limiting his work schedule, managing his diet, and taking his mail. She also had a room set aside upstairs in the White House where he could practice his painting in solitude. She provided him strong emotional support at a time in which he did not have the energy or desire to carry out his responsibilities as president. When it was unclear whether Ike would run for a second term in 1956 due to his health, Mamie encouraged him to run. She was protective of her husband during his periods of illness, at one point informing Pat Nixon without his knowledge that he was not healthy enough to campaign for Richard Nixon in the 1960 presidential election. Mamie also had medical concerns of her own; among others, she was uneasy on her feet due to Ménière's disease, an inner-ear disorder that affects equilibrium, which fed rumors that she had a drinking problem.

Politics 
Eisenhower had little interest in the political aspects of the presidency, and she was never directly involved in her husband's decisions. She entered the West Wing of the White House only four times during her tenure. This lack of political involvement contributed to her subservient image that protected her from heavy media scrutiny and bolstered her popularity. The main political cause that held her interest was that of social issues, including women's issues and civil rights. She expressed a desire to see women elected to Congress, and she sponsored several women's clubs. She also saw to inviting Black women to the White House, including Marian Anderson and the National Council of Negro Women. Other causes that she supported include soldiers' benefits, civil defense, blood drives, and the United Nations. Following her husband's heart attack, she chaired fundraising for the American Heart Association. The president would also consult her at times on economic issues, having depended on her for finance throughout their marriage.

Her control over the guest list and social scheduling allowed Eisenhower some degree of political influence. When organizing the 1953 annual vice president's dinner, she invited every senator with the exception of Joseph McCarthy, allowing the president to maintain distance from the controversial senator without taking a stance. When the President of Haiti visited the White House, she ensured he would be received with full honors to celebrate the first Black head of state to visit the White House. Most of her influence in the Oval Office came through her social role; she made a point of knowing the president's cabinet members and support staff, and she congratulated them and their wives on successes in order to improve morale.

Eisenhower was reportedly unhappy with the idea of John F. Kennedy coming into office following her husband's term and expressed displeasure about new First Lady Jacqueline Kennedy; she referred to Mrs. Kennedy as "the college girl". Jacqueline Kennedy had just given birth to son John Jr. via caesarean section two weeks prior to a planned tour of the White House; however, Mamie Eisenhower did not inform Jacqueline Kennedy that there was a wheelchair available for her to use while showing her the various sections of the White House. Seeing Eisenhower's displeasure during the tour, Kennedy kept her composure while in Eisenhower's presence, finally collapsing in private once she returned home. When Mamie Eisenhower was later questioned as to why she would do such a thing, the former first lady simply stated, "Because she never asked."

Later life

In 1961, Eisenhower retired with the former president to Gettysburg, their first permanent home. They also had a retirement home in Palm Desert, California. She made appearances on occasion for the Kennedy administration, including a fundraiser for the National Cultural Center and a state dinner with the Prime Minister of Japan. As her husband was dying, legislation was passed for Eisenhower that guaranteed lifetime Secret Service protection for presidential widows. When Ike died in 1969, Mamie went to Belgium where their son had been serving as ambassador. After returning to the United States, she continued to live full-time on the farm until she took an apartment in Washington, D.C. as her health declined in the late 1970s. She often stayed in her bedroom after her husband's death while Secret Service agents supported her.

Eisenhower remained close with the Nixon family after her tenure as first lady, and the two families were married together when her grandson married the Nixons' daughter in 1968. She appeared in a commercial to support Richard Nixon's reelection in the 1972 presidential election, and the Nixons regularly invited Mamie to the White House throughout the Nixon presidency. She took stronger political stances later in life; she supported the Vietnam War, though she recognized the hardship faced by American soldiers, and she also opposed the women's liberation movement. She supported the candidacy of Dick Thornburgh for governor of Pennsylvania, and she supported George H. W. Bush in the 1980 Republican Party presidential primaries. In 1973, Eisenhower finally addressed rumors of alcoholism in an interview, explaining the nature of her vertigo. Rumors of Ike's alleged affair with Kay Summersby reemerged in the 1970s, though Mamie continued to say that she did not believe them.

Death 
Eisenhower suffered a stroke on September 25, 1979. She was rushed to Walter Reed Army Medical Center, where her husband had died a decade before. Eisenhower remained in the hospital, and on October 31, announced to her granddaughter Mary Jean that she would die the next day. She died in her sleep on the morning of November 1, just 13 days before her 83rd birthday. A memorial service was held in the Fort Myer chapel on November 5 with attendants including the Nixons, Rosalynn Carter, Senator Jacob Javits, Federal Reserve Chair Arthur F. Burns, and Eisenhower's Secret Service agents. She was buried beside her husband in his hometown of Abilene, Kansas.

Legacy 
 

Eisenhower's birthplace is open to the public and operated by the Mamie Doud Eisenhower Foundation. Places bearing the name Mamie Eisenhower include a park in Denver in 1957 and a library in the Denver suburb of Broomfield, Colorado in 1963. She was inducted into the Colorado Women's Hall of Fame in 1985.

Impact on fashion 
Eisenhower was known for her sense of fashion, and her style was adopted by many women. She was named one of the twelve best-dressed women in the country by the New York Dress Institute every year that she was first lady. Her style was known as the "Mamie Look"; it involved a full-skirted dress, pink gloves, charm bracelets, pearls, little hats, purses, and bobbed, banged hair. Her fashion style was associated with Dior's postwar "New Look", and it included both high- and low-end items. Her frugality affected her fashion style, often seeking out bargains and keeping clothes long after she purchased them.

Eisenhower wore a Nettie Rosenstein gown to the 1953 inaugural balls, a pink peau de soie gown embroidered with more than 2,000 rhinestones. It is one of the most popular of the Smithsonian National Museum of American History's collection of inaugural gowns. Eisenhower paired the gown with matching gloves, and jewelry by Trifari. She carried a beaded purse by Judith Leiber (then an employee of Nettie Rosenstein). Her shoes by Delman had her name printed on the left instep. Eisenhower first adopted her iconic bangs while Ike was stationed in Panama; she found that the hairstyle helped her keep cool in the tropical environment, and she decided to keep it after returning to the United States. She owned many cosmetics and perfumes, and she often visited a beauty spa to maintain her personal appearance. Eisenhower's fondness for a specific shade of pink, often called "First Lady" or "Mamie" pink, kicked off a national trend for pink clothing, housewares, and bathrooms.

Historical assessments
Eisenhower is remembered neither as a traditionalist like Bess Truman nor as an activist like Eleanor Roosevelt. Her tenure occurred at a time when the role was undergoing major changes and growing in prominence. Her influence on the Eisenhower administration was reserved, respecting a strict division between her husband's public life and their home life. To the public she symbolized the glamor, style, and growth associated with the United States in the 1950s. She played the role of the "perfect wife" of her era: highly feminine, subservient to her husband, and focused on the household. The most significant effect that Eisenhower had on the position of first lady was the organization of a dedicated personal staff that would become the Office of the First Lady of the United States.

Since 1982, Siena College Research Institute has periodically conducted a survey asking historians to assess American first ladies according to a cumulative score on their background, value to the country, intelligence, courage, accomplishments, integrity, leadership, being their own women, public image, and value to the president. Eisenhower has been ranked:

In an additional question accompanying the 2014 survey, Eisenhower placed third among 20th- and 21st-century first ladies who historians felt could have done more. In the 2014 survey, Eisenhower and her husband were also ranked 14th out of 39 first couples in terms of being a "power couple".

References

Bibliography

Further reading
 Holt, Marilyn Irvin. Mamie Doud Eisenhower: The General's First Lady. Lawrence: University Press of Kansas, 2007.  
 Kimball, D. L. I Remember Mamie. Fayette, IA: Trends & Events, 1981.

External links
 
 Mamie Eisenhower Letters at Gettysburg College
 Mamie Eisenhower at C-SPAN's First Ladies: Influence & Image

1896 births
1979 deaths
19th-century American women
20th-century American women
19th-century Presbyterians
20th-century Presbyterians
American people of English descent
American people of Swedish descent
American Presbyterians
Burials in Kansas
Dwight D. Eisenhower
Eisenhower family
First ladies of the United States
Iowa Republicans
People from Boone, Iowa
People from Cedar Rapids, Iowa
People from Gettysburg, Pennsylvania
People from Palm Desert, California
People with Ménière's Disease
Pennsylvania Republicans
Washington, D.C., Republicans
American people in the American Philippines